William Hartwell (born 1880) was an English footballer. His regular position was as a forward. He was born in Northampton, East Midlands. He played for Kettering Town, Northampton Town, and Manchester United.

External links
MUFCInfo.com profile

1880 births
English footballers
Kettering Town F.C. players
Manchester United F.C. players
Northampton Town F.C. players
Year of death missing
Association football forwards